Ronald (Ron) Geoffery Johanson  ACS was the National President of the Australian Cinematographers Society (ACS) from 2008 to 2022 and is one of the most respected and awarded directors and cinematographers in Australia. He was awarded a Medal of the Order of Australia (OAM) on 26 January 2014 for service to the arts, particularly as a cinematographer and film director.

He started his career as a camera assistant on the popular TV series Homicide and Hunter. He went freelance, and gained great experience assisting the leading Melbourne cinematographers of the day. Ron then joined Fred Schepisi's Film House as an assistant cameraman. Ron returned to Senior Films and was promoted to Director of Photography for 34 episodes of the TV drama series Ryan.

Ron has shot and directed hundreds of television commercials, music videos and documentaries and was Director of Photography on the feature film Final Cut produced by Mike Williams. Scott Hicks chose Ron as Director of Photography for his feature film Freedom. He then shot second unit on The Mango Tree and The Odd Angry Shot.

In 1999, Ron was presented with a special Kodak Award for services to the film industry. In 2004 he was inducted into the ACS Hall of Fame and in the same year received the Queensland New Filmmakers Kinetone Award for contribution to the Queensland Film Industry. In 2009 he was inducted into the Queensland Advertising Hall of Fame. Over the years Ron has received numerous awards for his work, including:
4 New York Festival International Advertising Awards
3 Mobius Awards for Advertising
3 Gold ACS Awards (also 1 silver, 1 bronze)
2 Cannes Lions
2 Gold Tripods
1 special 'Kodak Award' for services to the film industry
1 Queensland New Filmmakers 'Kinetone Award'
1 Order of Australia Medal

References

External links
 

Living people
Australian cinematographers
Australian directors
Year of birth missing (living people)